Software Technology Parks of India (STPI) is an S&T organization under Ministry of Electronics and Information Technology (MeitY) engaged in promoting IT/ ITES Industry, Innovation, R&D, Start-ups, Product/ IP creation in the field of emerging technologies like Internet of Things (IoT), Blockchain, Artificial Intelligence (AI), Machine Learning (ML), Computer Vision, Robotics, Augmented & Virtual Reality, Animation & Visual effect (AVGC), Data Science & Analytics for various domains like FinTech, Agritech, MedTech, Autonomous Connected Electric & Shared(ACES) Mobility, ESDM, Cyber Security, Gaming, Industry 4.0, Drone, Efficiency Augmentation, etc.. STPI was established in 1991 by the Indian Ministry of Electronics and Information Technology (MeitY) with the objective of encouraging, promoting and boosting the export of software from India. STPI Headquarters is located in New Delhi with 62 Centres spread across the country. STPI has expanded its presence pan-India to support IT/ITeS Industry. Working closely with all stakeholders, STPI has played a key role in transforming the country as the preferred IT destination

Overview
STPI provides infrastructure, skilling, mentoring, market connect and supports startups.

The exports clocked by STP-registered units stands at Rs 4.21 trillion in 2019–2020. and it's estimated to have touched Rs 2.49 lakh crore in H1 FY21.

The growth of STPI - Noida unit exporting IT/ITeS is 52,795 crores in FY 2019-20 which made Noida as the major IT hub of North India. STPI Noida registered unit's export have grown over 21 times from Rs. 2,450 crores in FY 1999–2000.

STPI registered unit's exports stand to Rs 4,21,103 crore in 2019-20 from Rs 52 crores in 1992–1993. In December 2022, Union Minister of State for Electronics and IT Rajeev Chandrasekhar, in a written reply to a question in Rajya Sabha informed that IT units registered with state-run Software Technology Parks of India (STPI)  have exported software worth Rs 6.29 lakh crore in 2021-22.

STPI Centres of Entrepreneurship (CoEs)
Domain centric Centre of Entrepreneurship is established in association with blue-chip companies and academic institutions. A Blockchain CoE is set up in STPI incubation centre in Gurugram in year 2020.

 FinBlue at Chennai
 MOTION at Pune
 NEURON at Mohali
 Apiary at Gurugram
 IMAGE at Hyderabad
 MedTech CoE at Lucknow
 IoT OpenLab at Bengaluru 
 Electropreneur Park at Bhubaneswar
 VARCoE at Bhubaneswar
FabLab at Bhubaneswar 
National Data Repository at Bhubaneswar 
 IoT in Agriculture CoE at Guwahati
 Animation CoE at Shillong
 Emerging Technologies – AR/VR CoE at Imphal

Electropreneur Park

STPI has established a joint venture to set up an 'Electropreneur Park' with the India Electronics and Semiconductor Association (IESA).This is aimed at supporting 50 startups working on electronics product designing and development over the next five years. The initiative is a subset of the government's 'Make in India' mission, aligned with entrepreneurial and innovation focus. There are currently two Electropreneur parks in New Delhi & Bhubaneswar.

Next Generation Incubation Scheme (NGIS)

Next Generation Incubation Scheme (NGIS) is one of the flagship incubation scheme by STPI To build innovative technology products and solutions in an indigenous manner by offering comprehensive support & services to budding start-up ecosystem in India. STPI envisioned setting up 21 Centres of Excellence in emerging technology across India to provide proper handholding to the startup ecosystem for building indigenous products and IPR creation.

STPI - India BPO Promotion Scheme

STPI envisaged under Digital India program launched the India BPO Promotion Scheme (IBPS). this scheme seek to incentivize establishment of 48,300 seats in respect of BPO/ITES operations across India. STPI is the nodal agency of this scheme under the Ministry of Electronics and Information Technology. Director General STPI has announced to launch 48,000 such seats across the country, with a target employment of 72,450 in the sector. The government provides financial support of up to Rs 1 lakh per seat under two plans—India BPO Promotion Scheme and North East BPO Promotion Scheme. The Scheme is distributed among each State in proportion of State's population with an outlay of Rs. 493 Crore. 39,390 employment reported as of April 2021 under the India BPO Promotion Scheme (IBPS).

Visakhapatnam has created 10,000 jobs under the India BPO Promotion Scheme (IBPS), Andhra Pradesh state got 13,792 seat, out of 45,792 seats in India.

Organisation and administration 

With nine jurisdictional directorates and 60 centres headed by Director general, STPI has its presence in pan-India to support IT/ITeS Industry.

STPI maintains internal engineering resources to provide consulting, training and implementation services. Services cover network design, system integration, installation, operations and maintenance of application networks and facilities in varied areas. The process development of STPI is in accordance to the Quality Management System, and adheres to ISO 9001 certification. The STP Scheme provides various benefits to the registered units, including 100% foreign equity, tax incentives, duty-free import, duty-free indigenous procurement, CST reimbursement, DTA entitlement, and deemed exporting.

STPI Role 
STP units exported software and information technology worth Rs. 215264 crore in FY 2010–11. The state with the largest export contribution was Karnataka followed by Maharashtra, Tamil Nadu, Haryana and Telangana. STPI has a presence in many major cities of India including the cities of Bangalore, Chennai, Hyderabad, Trivandrum, Kanpur, Patna, Bhubaneswar, Kolkata, Mumbai, Nagpur, Warangal, Gandhinagar, Kakinada, Lucknow, Pune, Surat, Tirupati, Vijayawada and Visakhapatnam.

Besides regulating the STP scheme, STPI centers provide a variety of services including high-speed data communication, incubation facilities, consultancy, network monitoring, data centers and data hosting. STPI provides physical hosting for the National Internet Exchange of India.

The tax benefits under the Income Tax Act Section 10A applicable to STP units has expired since March 2011. While the Government has chosen not to extend the Sec 10A benefits against the demand by the IT units, most of the STP registered SME units will be affected, and now will have to pay income tax on profits earned from exports.

A new incentive scheme for IT and ITES companies is under discussion. It will help dispersal of IT industry in smaller cities and also support STPI-registered units which have not come under SEZs as well as other units which are not covered under any incentive scheme. This incentive scheme is seen as an alternate scheme to compensate the STPI units, but the same would be restricted to those units located in tier II and III cities.

Exports Awards by STPI 

STPI in association with Indian state governments provides Exports Awards.

Exports by STPI registered IT/ITeS units 
The overall exports done by STPI registered IT/ITeS units increased from 2,73,313 crore
in 2013–14 to 2,93,797 crore in 2014–15, an increase of 7.49%. The bifurcation of 2014-15 exports is as follows:
 Exports from units availing servicesunder STP scheme (under FTDR Act, 1992) is Rs 2,84,384.10 crore.
 Exports from units availing only Softex attestation services is Rs 9,412.40 crore.

All figures in crores of INR

Exports by EHTP units
The exports made by EHTP units decreased by 26.35% from 27091.54 crore in 2013–14 to 19951.81 crore in 2014–15.

References

External links 
 Official website

Government agencies of India
Software technology parks in India
Government agencies established in 1991
1991 establishments in Delhi